Fury is a 2014 American war film written and directed by David Ayer, and starring Brad Pitt in the lead role, Shia LaBeouf, Logan Lerman, Michael Peña, Jon Bernthal, Jason Isaacs and Scott Eastwood. The film portrays US tank crews fighting in Germany during the final weeks of the European theater of World War II. Ayer was influenced by the service of veterans in his family and by reading books such as Belton Y. Cooper's Death Traps, about American armored units in World War II and the high casualty rates suffered by tank crews in Europe.

Production began in early September 2013, in Hertfordshire, England, followed by principal photography on September 30, 2013, in Oxfordshire. Filming continued for a month and a half at different locations, which included the city of Oxford, and concluded on November 13. Fury was released on October 17, 2014, received positive reviews, and grossed $211 million worldwide.

Plot

In April of 1945, the Allies make their final push into Nazi Germany, encountering fanatical resistance. Don "Wardaddy" Collier, a battle-hardened U.S. Army Staff Sergeant in the Second Armored Division, commands an M4 Sherman tank nicknamed Fury and its veteran crew: gunner Boyd "Bible" Swan, loader Grady "Coon-Ass" Travis, driver Trini "Gordo" Garcia, and assistant driver–bow gunner "Red," all of whom have fought together since the North African campaign. Red is killed in a tank battle and replaced by Private First Class Norman Ellison, a young clerk from V Corps.

As Fury moves deeper into Germany, Norman's inexperience becomes dangerous: He fails to stop some Hitler Youth child soldiers from ambushing the platoon leader's tank with a Panzerfaust, which kills the entire crew. Later, he hesitates under fire during a battle with anti-tank guns. After the battle, Don orders Norman to execute a German prisoner. When he refuses, Don wrestles the pistol into his hand and forces him to pull the trigger, killing the prisoner and traumatizing Norman.

After the platoon captures a small town, Don and Norman search an apartment and encounter a German woman named Irma, and her younger cousin Emma. Don pays them for a hot meal and some hot water for a shave. Norman and Emma bond, and at Don's urging, the two go into the bedroom and become intimate. Later, as the four sit down to eat, the rest of the crew drunkenly barges in, harassing the women and bullying Norman, but Don firmly rebukes them. They are then called away for an urgent mission, but German artillery strikes the town as they prepare to leave, which kills Emma and further traumatizes Norman.

The tanks receive orders to capture and hold a vital crossroads to protect the division's vulnerable rear lines. En route, they are ambushed by a Tiger tank, which wipes out the entire platoon except for Fury. Fury eventually destroys the Tiger by outmaneuvering it and firing into its thinner rear armor. Unable to notify his superiors because the radio has been damaged, Don decides they must continue their mission. Upon arriving at the crossroads, the tank is immobilized by a landmine. Don sends Norman to scout a nearby hill; from there, he spots a battalion of Waffen-SS infantry approaching. Don decides to stay, convincing the others to stand and fight.

The men disguise Fury to make it appear knocked out and then hide inside. While they wait, the crew finally gives Norman a nickname – "Machine" – to show their acceptance of him. They then ambush the Germans, inflicting heavy casualties in a long and vicious battle. Grady is killed by a Panzerfaust that penetrates the turret, Gordo is shot while unpinning a grenade and sacrifices himself by covering it before it explodes, then a sniper kills Bible and severely wounds Don. Out of ammunition and surrounded, Don orders Norman to escape through the floor hatch as the Germans drop potato masher grenades into the tank. Norman slips out just before they explode, killing Don. Norman tries to hide as the Germans move on, but is spotted by a young SS soldier. The soldier hesitates, then leaves, deciding not to alert his comrades.

The next morning, Norman crawls back into the tank, where he covers Don's body with his jacket. He is rescued by American soldiers who praise him as a hero. As Norman is driven away in an ambulance, he looks back at the disabled Fury while the American troops continue their advance.

Cast

Production

Casting
On April 3, 2013, Sony started assembling the cast for the film when Brad Pitt, who previously starred in the WWII film Inglourious Basterds (2009), entered final talks to take the lead role of Wardaddy. On April 23, Shia LaBeouf joined the cast. On May 1, it was announced that Logan Lerman had also joined Furys cast, playing Pitt's crew member Norman Ellison. On May 14, The Hollywood Reporter announced that Michael Peña was in negotiations to play a member of Pitt's tank crew. With his addition to the cast, Fury became one of the few films to show Hispanic-Americans serving in WWII. On May 17, Jon Bernthal joined the cast as Grady Travis, a cunning, vicious, and world-wise Arkansas native. On August 26, Scott Eastwood also joined the cast, playing Sergeant Miles. On September 19, Brad William Henke joined as Sergeant Roy Davis, commander of another tank, Lucy Sue (the third Sherman destroyed by the Tiger). Jason Isaacs was cast on October 7, 2013. Other cast members include Xavier Samuel, Jim Parrack, Eugenia Kuzmina, Kevin Vance, and Branko Tomović.

Preparation 
Ayer required the actors to undergo four months of preparation for filming, including a week-long boot camp run by Navy SEALs. Pitt said, "It was set up to break us down, to keep us cold, to keep us exhausted, to make us miserable, to keep us wet, make us eat cold food. And if our stuff wasn't together we had to pay for it with physical forfeits. We're up at five in the morning, we're doing night watches on the hour."

Ayer also pushed the cast to physically spar each other, leading to black eyes and bloody noses. They insulted each other with personal attacks as well. On top of that, the actors were forced to live in the tank together for an extended period of time where they ate, slept, and defecated.

Ayer said, "I am ruthless as a director. I will do whatever I think is necessary to get what I want."

Filming
The film's crews were rehearsing the film scenes in Hertfordshire in September 2013. The crew were also sighted filming in various locations in North West England. Brad Pitt was spotted in preparations for Fury driving a tank on September 3 in the English countryside. Principal photography began on September 30, 2013, in the Oxfordshire countryside. Pinewood Studios sent warning letters to the villagers of Shirburn, Pyrton, and Watlington that there would be sounds of gunfire and explosions during the filming of Fury.

On October 15, 2013, a stuntman was accidentally stabbed in the shoulder with a bayonet while rehearsing at the set in Pyrton. He was taken to the John Radcliffe Hospital in Oxford by air ambulance. Police treated it as an accident. In November 2013, the film caused controversy by shooting a scene on Remembrance Day in which extras wore Wehrmacht and Waffen-SS uniforms. Ayer and Sony apologized.

Music

On November 19, 2013, composer Steven Price signed on to score the film. Varèse Sarabande released the original soundtrack album for the film on October 14, 2014.

Portrayal of history

Ayer sought authentic uniforms and weapons appropriate to the period of the final months of the war in Europe. 
The film was shot in the United Kingdom, partly due to the availability of working World War II-era tanks. The film featured Tiger 131, the last surviving operational Tiger I, owned by The Tank Museum at Bovington, England. It was the first time since the film They Were Not Divided (1950) that a real Tiger tank was used on a film set. Tiger 131 is a very early model Tiger I tank, and externally it has some significant differences from later Tiger I models. In the last weeks of the war, some early model Tigers were used in last ditch defense efforts; one of Germany's last Tigers to be lost at the Brandenburg Gate in Berlin was of a similar vintage.

Ten working M4 Sherman tanks were used. The Sherman tank Fury was portrayed using an M4A2E8 HVSS Sherman tank named RON/HARRY (T224875), also lent by The Tank Museum.

Ayer's attention to detail extended to the maps used in the film. A 1943 wartime map of Hannover, Germany, held in McMaster University's Lloyd Reeds Map Collection, was used to demonstrate the types of resources relied on by Allied forces.

While the storyline is fictional, the depiction of Fury and its commander Wardaddy parallels the experience of several real Allied tankers, such as the American tank commander Staff Sergeant Lafayette G. "War Daddy" Pool, who landed just after D-Day and destroyed 258 enemy vehicles before his tank was knocked out in Germany in late 1944, and the small number of Sherman tanks to survive from the landing at D-Day to the end of the war, such as Bomb, a Sherman tank that landed at D-Day and survived into the bitter fighting in Germany at the war's end, one of two Canadian Sherman tanks to survive the fighting from D-Day to VE Day. The plot also has some similarities to the battle of Crailsheim, fought in Germany in 1945. The last stand of the crew of the disabled Fury appears to be based on an anecdote from Death Traps, wherein a lone tanker was "in his tank on a road junction" when a "German infantry unit approached, apparently not spotting the tank in the darkness". This unnamed tanker is said to have ricocheted shells into the enemy forces, fired all of his machine gun ammunition, and thrown grenades to kill German soldiers climbing onto the tank. Cooper concluded: "When our infantry arrived the next day, they found the brave young tanker still alive in his tank. The entire surrounding area was littered with German dead and wounded."

Release
Sony Pictures Releasing had previously set November 14, 2014 as the American release date for Fury. On August 12, 2014, the date was moved up from its original release date of November 14, 2014 to October 17, 2014. The film premiered in London on October 20, 2014, as a closing film of London Film Festival and was theatrically released in the United Kingdom on October 22, 2014.

Fury had its world premiere at Newseum in Washington, D.C. on October 15, 2014, followed by a wide release across 3,173 theaters in North America on October 17.

Home media
The film was released on DVD and Blu-ray in the United States on January 27, 2015. It was  released on Ultra HD Blu-ray on May 22, 2018.

Partnership with World of Tanks
The film additionally had a partnership with the video game World of Tanks, where the main tank from the film, Fury, was available for purchase in-game using real currency for a limited time after the film's release. The tank also served as the centerpiece in themed events in the vein of the film following its release.  The Blitz version has been widely criticized due to the lack of attention to detail on the in game Fury Model. An Ipetitions page was created with a goal of 1,000 signatures seeking Wargaming to fix the Fury tank model, only 176 signatures have been signed as of Thursday, September 6, 2018. Additionally, in the 2019 Blitz fair, the Fury was sold for 30,000 in-game gold, prompting players to criticize Wargaming for greed and the overall ridiculous price.

As part of the UK DVD release, the game also hid 300,000 codes inside copies of the film, which gave in-game rewards and bonuses.<ref
name="SPREAD_THE_WORD_CONTEST(GamePage)">" SPREAD THE WORD CONTEST - FURY IN UK STORES"  World of Tanks Blitz official website's news post on the matter, describing partnership and special in-game events, Retrieved February 23rd, 2015</ref>

Piracy
The film was leaked onto peer-to-peer file-sharing websites as part of the Sony Pictures hack by the hacker group "Guardians of Peace" on November 27, 2014. Along with it came four unreleased Sony Pictures films (Annie, Mr. Turner, Still Alice, and To Write Love on Her Arms). Within three days of the initial leak, Fury had been downloaded an estimated 1.2 million times.

Reception

Box office

Fury was a box office success. The film grossed $85.8 million in the US and Canada, and $126 million in other countries for a worldwide total of $211.8 million, against a budget of $68 million.

US and Canada
Fury was released on October 17, 2014, in North America across 3,173 theaters. It earned $1.2 million from Thursday late-night showings from 2,489 theaters. On its opening day, the film grossed $8.8 million. The film topped the box office on its opening weekend earning $23,500,000 at an average of $7,406 per theater. The film's opening weekend gross is David Ayer's biggest hit of his (now five-film) directorial career, surpassing the $13.1 million debut of End of Watch and his third-biggest opening as a writer behind 2001's The Fast and the Furious ($40 million) and 2003's S.W.A.T. ($37 million). In its second weekend the film earned $13 million (-45%).

Other countries
Fury was released a week following its North American debut and earned $11.2 million from 1,975 screens in 15 markets. The film went number one in Australia ($2.2 million) and number five in France ($2.1 million). In UK, the film topped the box office in its opening weekend with £2.69 million ($4.2 million) knocking off Teenage Mutant Ninja Turtles which earned £1.92 million ($3.1 million) from the top spot. In its second weekend the film added $14.6 million in 44 markets, bringing the overseas cumulative audience [cume] to $37.8 million. It went number one in Finland ($410,000) and in  Ukraine ($420,000).

Critical response
On Rotten Tomatoes, the film has an approval rating of 76% based on 257 reviews, with an average rating of 6.92/10. The website's critical consensus reads, "Overall, Fury is a well-acted, suitably raw depiction of the horrors of war that offers visceral battle scenes but doesn't quite live up to its larger ambitions." On Metacritic, the film has a score of 64 out of 100, based on 47 critics, indicating "generally favorable reviews". Audiences surveyed by CinemaScore gave the film an average grade of "A−" on an A+ to F scale. The opening weekend audience was 60% male, with 51 percent over the age of 35.

Mick LaSalle of the San Francisco Chronicle gave a 4-out-of-4 rating and wrote: "A great movie lets you know you're in safe hands from the beginning." The New York Times critic A. O. Scott praised the film and Pitt's character, "Within this gore-spattered, superficially nihilistic carapace is an old-fashioned platoon picture, a sensitive and superbly acted tale of male bonding under duress." James Berardinelli also gave the film a positive review saying: "This is a memorable motion picture, accurately depicting the horrors of war without reveling in the depravity of man (like Platoon). Equally, it shows instances of humanity without resorting to the rah-rah, sanitized perspective that infiltrated many war films of the 1950s and 1960s. It's as good a World War II film as I've seen in recent years, and contains perhaps the most draining battlefield sequences since Saving Private Ryan." Kenneth Turan for the Los Angeles Times praised the film highly, writing: The "best job I ever had" sentence "is one of the catchphrases the men in this killing machine use with each other, and the ghastly thing is they half believe it's true."

Peter Debruge said in Variety, "Brad Pitt plays a watered-down version of his Inglourious Basterds character in this disappointingly bland look at a World War II tank crew." New York magazine's David Edelstein said, "Though much of Fury crumbles in the mind, the power of its best moments lingers: the writhing of Ellison as he's forced to kill; the frightening vibe of the scene with German women; the meanness on some soldiers' faces and soul-sickness on others'."

Accolades

References

Further reading

External links

Official website
 
 
 
 
 
Crossroad location

2014 films
2010s action war films
American World War II films
American action war films
American historical films
Columbia Pictures films
Films directed by David Ayer
Films about armoured warfare
Films about Nazi Germany
Films set in 1945
Films shot in Oxfordshire
Films shot in Hertfordshire
Films shot in London
IMAX films
QED International films
Western Front of World War II films
World War II films based on actual events
Films with screenplays by David Ayer
Films produced by Bill Block
Fiction about tanks
Films scored by Steven Price
Films about the United States Army
2010s English-language films
2010s American films